Let's Welcome the Circus People is an album by the Guided by Voices member Tobin Sprout, released in 1999.

Production
Jim Eno plays drums on three of the album's songs.

Critical reception
Newsday wrote that the album "falls under the sway of a Beatles-meets-Pavement pop resonance."

Track listing 
 "Smokey Joe's Perfect Hair" – 3.40
 "Digging Up Wooden Teeth" – 3.57
 "Mayhem Stone" – 2.23
 "And So On" – 2.03
 "Making A Garden" – 2.49
 "Vertical Insect (The Lights Are On)" – 2.22
 "Maid To Order" – 3.56
 "Liquor Bag" – 2.47
 "Who's Adolescence" – 2.08
 "Lucifer's Flaming Hour" – 3.25
 "100% Delay" – 2.29
 "And Then The Crowd Showed Up" – 3.05

References

1999 albums
Tobin Sprout albums